Nicoleta Ancuța Bodnar (born 25 September 1998) is a Romanian rower who predominantly competes in double sculls, together with Simona Radiș. She won a gold medal at the 2021 Olympics and a silver at the 2019 World Rowing Championships.

References

External links

1998 births
Living people
Romanian female rowers
World Rowing Championships medalists for Romania
European Rowing Championships medalists
Olympic rowers of Romania
Rowers at the 2020 Summer Olympics
Medalists at the 2020 Summer Olympics
Olympic medalists in rowing
Olympic gold medalists for Romania
20th-century Romanian women
21st-century Romanian women